Outlaws of the Rockies is a 1945 American Western film directed by Ray Nazarro and written by J. Benton Cheney. The film stars Charles Starrett, Tex Harding, Dub Taylor, Carole Mathews, Carolina Cotton and Spade Cooley. The film was released on September 18, 1945, by Columbia Pictures.

Plot

Cast          
Charles Starrett as Steve Williams / The Durango Kid
Tex Harding as Tex Harding
Dub Taylor as Cannonball
Carole Mathews as Jane Stuart
Carolina Cotton as Carolina Cotton
Spade Cooley as Spade Cooley
Philip Van Zandt as Dan Chantry
I. Stanford Jolley as Ace Lanning
George Chesebro as Bill Jason
Steve Clark as Potter
Jack Rockwell as Sheriff Hall
Frank LaRue as Drake
James T. "Bud" Nelson as Pete

References

External links
 

1945 films
1940s English-language films
American Western (genre) films
1945 Western (genre) films
Columbia Pictures films
Films directed by Ray Nazarro
American black-and-white films
1940s American films